Michalopoulou is a Greek surname. Notable people with the surname include:

 Katerina Michalopoulou (born  1972), Greek model
 Michaela Michalopoulou (born 1980), Greek handball player

See also
 Michalopoulos

Greek-language surnames